Jesse Briscoe (June 6, 1882 – July 31, 1962) was an American Negro league outfielder in the 1910s.

A native of Louisville, Kentucky, Briscoe made his Negro leagues debut in 1910 with the New York Black Sox. He went on to play for several teams, finishing his career in 1914 with the Louisville White Sox and Chicago American Giants. Briscoe died in Louisville in 1962 at age 80.

References

External links
 and Seamheads

1882 births
1962 deaths
Chicago American Giants players
Indianapolis ABCs players
Louisville White Sox players
Minneapolis Keystones players
Baseball outfielders
Baseball players from Louisville, Kentucky
20th-century African-American people